This is a list of mammals for which there is documented evidence of homosexual behavior. These animals have been observed practicing homosexual courtship, sexual behavior, affection, pair bonding, or parenting.

Bruce Bagemihl writes that the presence of same-sex sexual behavior was not officially observed on a large scale until the 1990s due to possible observer bias caused by social attitudes towards LGBT people, which made homosexuality in animals a taboo subject. He devotes three chapters, "Two Hundred Years at Looking at Homosexual Wildlife", "Explaining (Away) Animal Homosexuality", and "Not For Breeding Only" in his 1999 book Biological Exuberance to the "documentation of systematic prejudices" where he notes "the present ignorance of biology lies precisely in its single-minded attempt to find reproductive (or other) "explanations" for homosexuality, transgender, and non-procreative and alternative heterosexualities. Petter Bøckman, academic adviser for the Against Nature? exhibit, stated "[M]any researchers have described homosexuality as something altogether different from sex. They must realise that animals can have sex with who they will, when they will and without consideration to a researcher's ethical principles". Homosexual behavior is  found amongst social birds and mammals, particularly the sea mammals and the primates.

Animal sexual behavior takes many different forms, even within the same species and the motivations for and implications of their behaviors have yet to be fully understood. Bagemihl's research shows that homosexual behavior, not necessarily sexual activity, has been documented in about 500 species as of 1999, ranging from primates to gut worms. Homosexuality in animals is controversial with some social conservatives because it asserts the naturalness of homosexuality in humans, while others counter that it has no implications and is nonsensical to equate animal behavior to morality. Animal preference and motivation is inferred from behavior, thus homosexual behavior has been given a number of terms over the years. Modern research applies the term homosexuality to all sexual behavior (copulation, genital stimulation, mating games and sexual display behavior) between animals of the same sex.

This is a list of some mammals that have been recorded engaging in homosexual behavior, which is part of a larger list of animals displaying homosexual behavior including birds, insects, fish, etc.

Selected images

List

 African buffalo
 African elephant
 Agile wallaby
 Amazon river dolphin
 American bison
 Antelope
 Asian elephant
 Asiatic mouflon
 Atlantic spotted dolphin
 Australian sea lion
 Barasingha
 Barbary sheep
 Beluga
 Bharal
 Bighorn sheep
 Black bear
 Blackbuck
 Black-footed rock wallaby
 Black-tailed deer
 Bonin flying fox
 Bonnet macaque
 Bonobo
 Bottlenose dolphin
 Bowhead whale
 Brazilian guinea pig
 Bridled dolphin
 Brown bear
 Brown capuchin
 Brown long-eared bat
 Brown rat
 Buffalo
 Caribou
 Cat (domestic)
 Cattle (domestic)
 Chacma baboon
 Cheetah
 Chimpanzee
 Chital
 Collared peccary
 Commerson's dolphin
 Common brushtail possum
 Common dolphin
 Common marmoset
 Common pipistrelle
 Common tree shrew
 Common wallaroo
 Cotton-top tamarin
 Crab-eating macaque
 Crested black macaque
 Dall's sheep
 Daubenton's bat
 Dog (domestic)
 Donkey
 Doria's tree kangaroo
 Dugong
 Dwarf cavy
 Dwarf mongoose
 Eastern cottontail rabbit
 Eastern grey kangaroo
 Elk
 European bison
 European polecat
 Fallow deer
 False killer whale
 Fat-tailed dunnart
 Fin whale
 Fox
 François' langur
 Gazelle
 Gelada baboon
 Goat (domestic)
 Golden monkey
 Gorilla
 Grant's gazelle
 Grey-headed flying fox
 Grey seal
 Grey squirrel
 Grey whale
 Grey wolf
 Grizzly bear
 Guinea pig (domestic)
 Hamadryas baboon
 Hamster (domestic)
 Hanuman langur
 Harbor porpoise
 Harbor seal
 Himalayan tahr
 Hoary marmot
 Horse (domestic)
 Human (see Human sexual behavior)
 Indian fruit bat
 Indian muntjac
 Indian rhinoceros
 Japanese macaque
 Javelina
 Kangaroo rat
 Killer whale
 Koala
 Kob
 Larga seal
 Least chipmunk
 Lechwe
 Lesser bushbaby
 Lion
 Lion-tailed macaque
 Lion tamarin
 Little brown bat
 Livingstone's fruit bat
 Long-eared hedgehog
 Long-footed tree shrew
 Macaque
 Markhor
 Marten
 Masked palm civet
 Moco
 Mohol galago
 Moor macaque
 Moose
 Mountain goat
 Mountain tree shrew
 Mountain zebra
 Mouse (domestic)
 Moustached tamarin
 Mule deer
 Musk-ox
 Natterer's bat
 New Zealand sea lion
 Nilgiri langur
 Noctule
 North American porcupine
 Northern elephant seal
 Northern fur seal
 Northern quoll
 Olympic marmot
 Orangutan
 Pacific striped dolphin
 Patas monkey
 Pere David's deer
 Pig (domestic)
 Pig-tailed macaque
 Plains zebra
 Polar bear
 Pretty-faced wallaby
 Proboscis monkey
 Pronghorn
 Przewalski's horse
 Pudú
 Puku
 Quokka
 Rabbit
 Raccoon
 Raccoon dog
 Red deer
 Red fox
 Red kangaroo
 Red-necked wallaby
 Red squirrel
 Reeves's muntjac
 Reindeer
 Rhesus macaque
 Right whale
 Rock cavy
 Rodrigues fruit bat
 Roe deer
 Rufous bettong
 Rufous-naped tamarin
 Rufous rat kangaroo
 Saddle-back tamarin
 Savanna baboon
 Sea otter
 Serotine bat
 Sheep (domestic)
 Siamang
 Sika deer
 Slender tree shrew
 Snub-nosed monkey
 Sooty mangabey
 Sperm whale
 Spider monkey
 Spinifex hopping mouse
 Spinner dolphin
 Spotted hyena
 Spotted seal
 Squirrel monkey
 Striped dolphin
 Stuart's marsupial mouse
 Stumptail macaque
 Swamp deer
 Swamp wallaby
 Takhi
 Talapoin
 Tammar wallaby
 Tasmanian devil
 Tibetan macaque
 Tasmanian rat kangaroo
 Thinhorn sheep
 Thomson's gazelle
 Tiger
 Tonkean macaque
 Tucuxi
 Urial
 Vampire bat
 Verreaux's sifaka
 Vervet
 Vicuna
 Walrus
 Wapiti
 Warthog
 Waterbuck
 Water buffalo
 Weeper capuchin
 Western grey kangaroo
 West Indian manatee
 Whiptail wallaby
 White-faced capuchin
 White-fronted capuchin
 White-handed gibbon
 White-lipped peccary
 White-tailed deer
 Wild cavy
 Wild goat
 Yellow-bellied marmot
 Yellow-footed rock wallaby
 Yellow-toothed cavy

See also
Homosexual behavior in animals#Mammals
Animal sexual behavior#Mammals
List of birds displaying homosexual behavior

Bibliography

References

Mammals
Mammals
Homosexual
Mammalian sexuality